Hycleus rouxi, is a species of blister beetle found in India, and Sri Lanka.

Description
Body length is about 9.8 to 13.2 mm. Head is 1.3 to 1.8 mm long with coarse deep and dense punctures. Eyes small and reniform. Pronotum moderately coarse, densely punctured. Pronotum covered with yellowish, dense pubescence. Elytra shallow, dense with moderately coarse to fine punctures. There is a continuous or discontinuous basal black band and an apical black band with or without yellow area in middle. Legs has black or reddish-black femora. Tibiae and tarsi are yellowish. Ventrum black and finely punctate. Pubescence very long, very dense, which becomes golden yellow on thorax, and black on abdomen. Male has black antennae which are curved, and clavate. The sixth visible abdominal sternum is deeply emarginate, but in female, it is narrowed to entire apex.

References 

Meloidae
Insects of Sri Lanka
Insects of India
Insects described in 1840